Pabna University of Science and Technology (PUST) is a government financed public university in Bangladesh. PUST was established in 2008. It is the  first science and Technology  University and third public University  in Rajshahi Division. It started its four-year undergraduate programme in 2009.This university plays an innovative role in providing need-based higher education, training, and research. It is the 7th science and technology University and 29th public University in Bangladesh.Like other public universities, PUST's admission test is considered to be very competitive.  Based on the results of the Higher Secondary Examination every year, an estimated 50,000 students take the admission test against only 950 seats.

History
The government passed an act on 15 July 2001 to establish a science and technology university in Pabna. Pabna is a central district town in northern Bangladesh, having a long historical and cultural heritage. The academic curriculum of Pabna University of Science and Technology was started on 15 July 2008. This university plays an innovative role in providing need-based higher education, training, and research. The university is committed to maintaining and raising the quality and standard of higher education for the students as in international standards. This practical and need-based curricula will produce highly qualified trained scientists and technologists for the needs of Bangladesh as well as the world employment market.

The university offers education in science- and technology-based subjects for undergraduate and postgraduate levels.

Campus
Pabna University of Science & Technology is on the south side of Pabna Dhaka highway. The PUST campus has an area of 30 acres.

Administration
 Chancellor: Abdul Hamid, President of Bangladesh
 Vice-Chancellor: Prof. Dr. Hafiza Khatun
 Pro-Vice-Chancellor: Prof. Dr. S. M. Mostafa Kamal Khan
 Registrar: Bijon Kumar Brahma (Additional)
 Proctor: Dr. Md. Hasebur Rahman
 Student Advisor: Dr. Samiron Kumar Saha

Deans
 Faculty of Engineering and Technology: Prof. Md. Saiful Islam
 Faculty of Science: Prof. Dr. Md. Khairul Alam
 Faculty of Business Studies: Prof. Dr. Md. Kamruzzaman
 Faculty of Humanities and Social Science: Prof. Dr. Md. Habibullah
 Faculty of Life and Earth Science: Dr. Md. Najmul Islam

List of vice-chancellors 
 Prof. Dr. Hafiza Khatun ( 13.04.2022 to Present )
 Prof. Dr. M. Rostom Ali ( 07.03.2018 to 06.03.2022 )
 Prof. Dr. Al-Nakib Chowdhury ( 02.01.2014 to 01.01.2018 )
 Prof. Dr. Md. Mozaffar Hossain ( 2009 to 2013 )
 Prof. Dr. Md. Amin Uddin Mridha ( 2008 to 2009 )

Faculty and departments
 Faculty of Engineering and Technology
 Department of Computer Science and Engineering (CSE)
 Department of Electrical and Electronic Engineering (EEE);
 Department of Electrical, Electronic and Communication Engineering (EECE);
 Department of Information and Communication Engineering (ICE);
 Department of Civil Engineering (CE);
 Department of Architecture (ARCH)
 Department of Urban and Regional Planning (URP)
 Faculty of Science
 Department of Physics (PHY)
 Department of Statistics (STAT)
 Department of Chemistry (CHE)
 Department of Pharmacy (PHARM)
 Department of Mathematics (MAT)
 Faculty of Business Studies
 Department of Business Administration (BA)
 Department of Tourism and Hospitality Management (THM)
 Faculty of Humanities and Social Science
 Department of Economics (ECO)
 Department of Bangla (BAN)
 Department of English (ENG)
 Department of Social Work (SW)
 Department of Public Administration (PAD)
 Department of History and Bangladesh Studies (HBS)
 Faculty of Life and Earth Science
 Department of Geography and Environment (GE)

Academic programs
 B.Sc. (Engineering)
 B. Arch.
 B. URP
 B.Sc. (Honours)
 B.B.A.
 B.A. (Honours)
 B.S.S. (Honours)
 B.Pharm. (Professional)
 M.Sc. Engineering
 M. Engineering
 M.Phil.
 Ph.D. and other higher degrees

Admission and total seats
In 21 departments there are 920 seats available for undergraduate admission.

At PUST, additional seats are reserved for the students under the categories of son/daughter/grandson/granddaughter of Freedom Fighter, Tribal and Disabled. For these reserved seats, a student needs to provide their related certificate to authority. Once the certificate is received in the mentioned period, after verification, the student will be considered for the reserved seats

Grading system
The academic year consists of two semesters. Academic courses are based on a credit system. The grading system:

Institutes
 Institute of Modern Language

Central Library and Information Center
The Central Library & Information Center of Pabna University of Science & Technology is basically designed to serve the need of its students, faculty, officers and researchers. It carries out activities to support academic and research endeavours and to promote a better understanding of the policies, curriculum and culture of the university.

Independence Square

Visitors come to visit Independence Square. The memorial stands in front of PUST Cafeteria. Cultural organizations arrange programs on the premises on local and national occasions.

Halls of residence
Pabna University of Science and Technology provides residence facilities to its students.

Male residential hall
 Bangabandhu Sheikh Mujibur Rahman hall
 Sheikh Rasel Hall (under construction)

Female residential hall
 Sheikh Hasina hall
 Sheikh Fajilatunnesa Mujib Hall(Under construction)

Teacher dormitories
There are two dormitories for teachers.

Publications
 Pabna University of Science and Technology Barta
 Bijaẏōllāsē nabamī (Bengali: বিজয়োল্লাসে নবমী)
 Scienteria

Facilities

Health services
The medical centre of PUST is on the ground floor of the administrative building. It offers free medical services to students, teachers, staff (and family members of the teachers and staff).

Transportation
The university is five hours by bus from Dhaka, the capital. The university provides a good transport facility both for students and teachers. All over Pabna town three micro-buses and one mini-bus provides service to our faculties from 8AM to 6PM. For students there are two double decker buses and two mini-bus. These buses run at three different times around Pabna town during the day as scheduled by the authority. They help the students to be in class in due time . The buses cover the major roads and areas of Pabna city, especially the traffic more, ananta bazar, terminal, meril bipuss, singa bipuss, and gachpara. Sometimes, they cover court and chadmari more.

Sports and entertainment 
The university provides facilities for football, hockey, cricket, volleyball, basketball, table tennis etc. The students play tennis, badminton and other games as well. Sports meets and games competitions are features of campus life. The students arrange debate, cultural show, indoor games competition, etc.

Central Library of PUST 
PUST library The Central Library & Information Center of Pabna University of Science & Technology is basically designed to serve the actual need of its students, faculty, officers and researchers. It carries out a variety of activities to support the academic and research endeavor and to promote a better understanding of the policies, curriculum and culture of the university.

Residence facilities 
Pabna University of Science and Technology provides residence facility to the male and female students, and also provide some indirect facilities to others. There are one hall for male students and one hall for female students .

Extracurricular activities

Sports
The students participate in sports for recreation and the finest athletes regularly compete in inter-university games like football, handball, volleyball, basketball etc. PUST has some varsity teams. Students organise inter-department and inter-university tournaments for popular games every year. Girls and teachers participate in several games.

Photo gallery

References

External links
 Official website

Public universities of Bangladesh
Universities of science and technology in Bangladesh
Educational institutions established in 2008
Organisations based in Pabna
Universities and colleges in Pabna District
2008 establishments in Bangladesh